The play-offs of the 2019 Fed Cup Asia/Oceania Zone Group I were the final stages of the Group I Zonal Competition involving teams from Asia and Oceania. Using the positions determined in their pools, the six teams faced off to determine their placing in the 2019 Fed Cup Asia/Oceania Zone Group I. The winner of the promotional play-off advanced to the World Group II Play-offs, while the losers of the relegation play-off was relegated to the Asia/Oceania Zone Group II along with the bottom team of Pool B in 2020.

Pool results

Promotion play-off 
The first placed teams of the two pools will be drawn in head-to-head rounds. The winner will advance to the World Group II Play-offs.

China vs. Kazakhstan

3rd place play-off
The second placed teams of the two pools will be drawn in head-to-head rounds to determine the third placed team.

India vs. South Korea

Relegation play-off 
The third placed teams of the two pools will be drawn in head-to-head rounds. The loser will be relegated to Asia/Oceania Zone Group II in 2020.

Indonesia vs. Thailand

Final placements 

  was promoted to the 2019 Fed Cup World Group II Play-offs.

See also 
Fed Cup structure

References

External links 
Fed Cup website

2019 Fed Cup Asia/Oceania Zone